The LLA Azteca Championship (Campeonato Azteca de LLA in Spanish) was a professional wrestling championship promoted by Consejo Mundial de Lucha Libre (CMLL) and Lucha Libre Azteca (LLA) between 2009 and 2014. This championship had no weight limit nor any other limits on who could become champion. It was sponsored by TV Azteca Noreste, who televised all championship matches and covered professional wrestling in Monterrey, Nuevo León on a weekly basis. The Championship was last seen on May 4, 2014 and was not promoted by LLA between that date and LLA's last show on September 27, 2015.

No champion was able to successfully defend the championship as it changed hands each time LLA and CMLL promoted a title match. As a professional wrestling championship, it was not won through athletic competition; it was instead won and lost via a scripted ending to a match. The championship was vacated on May 2, 2013, after a match between then-champion Místico and challengers La Sombra and Volador Jr. ended in a time limit draw and the title was vacated.

The championship was created in late 2009 as CMLL announced a one-night tournament to determine the first Azteca champion. The longest reigning champion was Último Guerrero who held the title for 234 days from December 19, 2009, to August 10, 2010. The youngest champion was Místico, who was born in 1991 and won the title in September 2012 making him 20 or 21 years old at the time. The shortest reigning champion was Héctor Garza who held the title for 124 days from August 10, 2010, to December 12, 2010. Último Guerrero holds the record for most reigns, the only person to win it twice.

Background

Lucha libre, (professional wrestling) is a form of entertainment where matches are presented as being competitive, but their outcomes are pre-determined by promoters. As part of presenting lucha libre as a genuine combat sport, promoters create championships that are used in the storylines presented on their shows; they are not won as result of genuinely competitive matches. The championship is represented by a belt for the champion to wear before or after a match.

In 2009, Mexican professional wrestling promotion Consejo Mundial de Lucha Libre ("World Wrestling Council"; CMLL) began working with the Monterrey, Nuevo León local promotion "Lucha Libre Azteca" (LLA), allowing wrestlers under CMLL contracts to work LLA shows. In 2009 LLA and CMLL decided to create the "Azteca Championship" as the centerpiece of their shows.

History

The Azteca Championship was created in late 2009 as a one-night tournament to determine the first Azteca champion on December 18. The tournament started out with two six-man tag team matches to reduce the field from 12 to 6 wrestler. Héctor Garza, Místico and Shocker defeated La Peste Negra (Negro Casas, El Felino and Mr. Niebla) while Los Guerreros de la Atlantida (Atlantis, Rey Bucanero and Último Guerrero) defeated Los Hijos del Averno (Averno, Ephesto and Mephisto) to advance to the semi-finals. The semi-final event was a torneo cibernetico elimination match that saw Atlantis and Último Guerrero as the final two survivors. In the end, Último Guerrero pinned his tag team partner Averno to become the first LLA Azteca Champion.
 
All championship matches except for the tournament to determine the first champion was held under "Three-way" rules, with three wrestlers in the ring concurrently. No champion was able to successfully defend the championship as it changed hands each time LLA promoted a title match at Gimnasio Nuevo León or Arena Solidaridad. As a professional wrestling championship, it was not won through athletic competition; it was instead won and lost via a scripted ending to a match. The championship was vacated on May 2, 2013, after a match between then-champion Místico and challengers La Sombra and Volador Jr. ended in a time limit draw. LLA held a match for the vacant championship over a year later, on May 4, 2014, where Atlantis defeated Último Guerrero by disqualification to win the championship for a second time. The championship was not promoted on any subsequent LLA shows, with LLA holding its last event on September 29, 2015, rendering it inactive after Atlantis won it.
 
The longest reigning champion was Último Guerrero who held the title for 234 days from December 19, 2009, to August 10, 2010. The youngest champion was Místico, who was born in 1991 and won the title in September 2012 making him 20 or 21 years old at the time. The shortest reigning champion was Héctor Garza who held the title for 124 days from August 10, 2010, to December 12, 2010. Último Guerrero and Atlantis are the only wrestlers to win the championship twice. The oldest champion was Atlantis who won at the age of 48 years and 75 days. The last champions was Místico, who defeated Atlantis and Último Guerrero for the championship on September 30, 2012, in Monterrey, Nuevo León.

Reigns

Combined reigns

Notes

Champion weight, lightest to heaviest
Místico: 
Atlantis: 
Volador Jr.: 
Último Guerrero: 
Héctor Garza: 
La Sombra 
Champion age at title win, youngest to oldest
Místico: 20–21 years
La Sombra: 
Volador Jr.: 
Último Guerrero    
Último Guerrero (2)   
Héctor Garza 
Atlantis 
Atlantis (2)

References

External links
LLA Azteca Championship

Consejo Mundial de Lucha Libre championships